Imphal (Meitei pronunciation: /im.pʰal/;) is the capital city of the Indian state of Manipur. The metropolitan centre of the city contains the ruins of Kangla Palace (officially known as Kangla Fort), the royal seat of the former Kingdom of Manipur, surrounded by a moat. Spread over parts of the districts of Imphal West and Imphal East, the former contains the majority of the city's area and population. Imphal is part of the Smart Cities Mission under the Ministry of Housing and Urban Affairs.

History

Initially ruled by King Khaba, Imphal was later ruled by the Pakhangba leaders. The clan of the Ningthouja tribe originated then. The Ningthouja tribe quickly expanded and dominated the region in politics and war. Kangla Palace was built by King Khagemba and his son Khunjaoba. The palace was later destroyed by the British during the Anglo-Manipur War. During the reign of Maharaja Bhagyachandra, there were a number of Burmese invasions. However, the kingdom survived with the help of Maharaj Gambhir Singh.

Imphal remained peaceful until 1891, when there were internal differences in the royal family. The British sent J.W. Quinton to help but the situation only grew worse and Senapati Tikendrajit was hanged. The autocratic British behavior made people angry. This resulted in the 1891 Anglo-Manipur War, which the British won.

The Battle of Imphal took place between March and July 1944, during World War II. The Japanese had invaded Imphal to destroy Allied forces and then invade India, but they were defeated and forced to retreat. The attack made the British realise the militarily strategic position of Imphal.

Geography and climate 

It has a humid subtropical climate (Köppen: Cwa) with cool, dry winters and a slightly hot monsoon season. Imphal enjoys a moderate climate tempered by its high altitude and the surrounding hills.

Demographics 
At the time of the 2011 census, Imphal Municipal Council had a population of 277,196, of which 135,059 were males and 142,137 females. Imphal had a sex ratio of 1052 females per 1000 males and a literacy rate of 90.8%: 95.1% for males and 86.77% for females. 29,216 (10.54%) were under 6 years of age, 14,997 being males and 14,219 females. Scheduled Castes and Scheduled Tribes made up 1,274 (0.46%) and 29,778 (10.74%) of the population respectively.

Hinduism is the majority religion in Imphal. Sanamahi followers are the second-largest group, and Imphal in particular contains a famous Pakhangba temple in Kangla Fort. Christianity is the third-largest religion, practiced mainly by the hill tribes in Imphal. Islam is a minority religion practiced by the Pangals, while Buddhism is practiced by the Gorkhas and Jainism by migrants from the mainland.

At the time of the 2011 census, 82.80% of the population spoke Manipuri, 3.65% Kabui, 2.20% Hindi, 1.39% Thadou, 1.31% Tangkhul, 1.18% Nepali, 1.11% Bengali, 1.10% Bhojpuri and 1.00% Kuki as their first language.

Government and politics 
Imphal is the state capital as well as the headquarters of the Imphal district. The civic administration of the city is under Imphal Municipal Corporation.

Civic administration 
According to Census 2011, Imphal constitutes 42.13% of the total urban population in Manipur. Hence, the history of urban local governance is longer in Imphal than in other parts of the state. The British established the Town Fund Board in Imphal in 1915, which was headed by the then Political Agent Lt. Col. H.W.G. Cole and other nominated members. The Town Fund Board continued after Independence and merger with India in 1949 and it was not headed by the Chief Secretary of Manipur Administration. In 1956, the Assam Municipal Act, 1923 was extended to Manipur and the Imphal Municipal Board was formed with 12 elected members. The strength of the elected members of this Board was increased to 24 in 1961 and to 28 in 1972. Initially, the Municipal Board was established only to administer the areas in Imphal under the British Reserve, covering  and 2,862 inhabitants.

In 1992, the Municipal Board was upgraded to a Municipal Council under the Manipur Municipality Act, 1994. In 2014, the council was upgraded to the status of Municipal Corporation. There are 27 wards under the Municipal Corporation, each with its own elected councillor. There are eight committees and five sections at the corporation to govern the administration of the city.

There are Ward Development Committees in each ward to look after developmental activities at the ward level. The local ward councillor is the chairperson of the committee, which includes two elected and two nominated members as well. The last election to the corporation was in 2016, with INC winning 12 seats, BJP winning 10 seats, and independent candidates winning 5 seats. According to the Manipur Municipality Act, 1994, the mayor is indirectly elected by the elected councillors from amongst themselves. The first mayor of the corporation was Soram Sunil and was elected in 2016. The present mayor of Imphal Municipal Corporation is Laisangbam Lokeshwar and was elected to the position in 2017. Sujata Phaomei is the present Deputy Mayor.

Representation in parliament 
Manipur is divided into two constituencies for the purpose of Lok Sabha - Outer Manipur Parliamentary Constituency and Inner Manipur Parliamentary Constituency. Imphal city is part of the Inner Manipur Parliamentary Constituency. The last elections took place during the 2019 Indian general elections. Rajkumar Ranjan Singh from the Bharatiya Janata Party won the election with 2,63,632 votes.

Civic amenities 
Manipur State Power Distribution Company Limited is responsible for electricity supply in the city. Public Health and Engineering Department of the Manipur Government looks after both water supply, and sewage and drainage in Imphal. Roads in the city are developed and maintained by the state Public Works Department. Imphal Municipal Corporation is responsible for Solid Waste Management. The state Department of Fire Services provides fire safety services in the city with one fire station, which is also the department headquarters.

Tourist attractions
Imphal offers sites of religious and historical importance within and around the city. Kangla Palace (also known as Kangla Fort) is on the banks of the Imphal River. Kangla means "dry land" in the Meitei language. It was the palace of King Pakhangba, and has religious significance with multiple temples present within the complex. It is also significant in Manipur's history with the British. Bihu Loukon is an ancient star-shaped fort made of mud situated in Maklang, Imphal West District. It was discovered in 2013. Hiyangthang Lairembi Temple is religious site important to both the local religion, Sanamahism, and to Hinduism. The temple is noted for its annual Durga Puja festival.

The place was the scene of action and the theater of the battle that took place between the British Army and the Japanese Forces fighting alongside the Indian National Army in World War II. Red Hill has now become a tourist attraction since the Japanese war veterans constructed a monument at the foot of this hill. The Imphal War Cemetery remembers Indian and British soldiers who fought and died in 1944 during World War II and is managed by the Commonwealth War Graves Commission.

Imphal is also home to the largest all women run market in Asia, called the Ima Keithel (Mothers' Market). It was established in the 16th century and hosts around 5,000–6,000 women vendors who sell a variety of products.

Transport

Air

Road

Imphal is connected by the National Highway to major cities like Lamka, Guwahati, Kohima, Agartala, Shillong, Dimapur, Aizawl, and Silchar.

Railway
In October 2012, India's Cabinet Committee on Infrastructure approved an extension of the Jiribam–Silchar railway to Imphal. The extension was expected to reach the city by 2019. The total length of the railway line is 110.62 km. The revised estimated cost of construction for the railway line sits at Rs 9658 crore, with Rs 4927.54 crore being spent as of 2019.

Sports

Khuman Lampak Main Stadium is a multi-purpose stadium in Imphal. It is used mostly for football and athletics. The stadium holds 30,000 people and was built in 1999. This stadium lies inside the Khuman Lampak Sports Complex. Imphal based professional football clubs NEROCA FC and TRAU FC of I-League play their home matches at this stadium.

Education

Universities

 Manipur Central University
 Central Agricultural University
 National Sports University
 Manipur University of Culture

Technical colleges
Indian Institute of Information Technology, Manipur
 Manipur Institute of Technology
 National Institute of Technology, Manipur
 Manipur Technical University

Medical colleges
 Regional Institute of Medical Sciences
 Jawaharlal Nehru Institute of Medical Science

Schools
There are many schools in Imphal affiliated with the Central Board of Secondary Education and Indian Certificate of Secondary Education Board, as well as state government schools.
Areca School, Ragailong
Catholic School, Canchipur
Comet School, Changangei
Dav Public School, Chingmeirong
Don Bosco School Imphal, Chingmeirong
Guru Nanak Public School
Herbert School
Jawahar Navodaya Vidyalaya, Khumbong (Imphal west), Imphal east, Bishnupur, CCpur, Ukrul, Thoubal, Tamenglong and Senapati
Johnstone Higher Secondary Public School
Kids' Foundation School, Ghari
Maria International Montessori School, Koirengei
Meci Explorer Academy Changangei 
Kendriya Vidyalaya No 1 Imphal, Lamphelpat
Kendriya Vidyalaya No 2 Imphal, Langjing
Nirmalabas High School, Imphal
Little Flower School
Lodestar Public School
Manipur Public School
Sainik International School & College Imphal
Savio English Higher Secondary Public School, Thangmeiband
St. Anthony's English School & College Imphal
St. John English High School, Nambol, Bishnupur District
St. Joseph School
St. Paul's English School
Sanfort International School & College Imphal
Sangai Higher Secondary Public School

Healthcare
Imphal has many private and government hospitals that are open 24 hours.
Regional Institute of Medical Sciences
Shija Hospitals & Research Institutes 
City Hospital 
Imphal Hospital
Raj Medicity
Sky Hospital and Research Institute
Mother's Care Hospital and Research Centre
Apex Hospital
Jawaharlal Nehru Institute of Medical Sciences
Horizon Hospital and Research Institute
Advanced Hospital
Catholic Medical Centre
Maipakpi Maternity and Child Hospital
Iboyaima Hospital
Asian Hospital
Lamjingba Hospital

Notable people
M. K. Binodini Devi, novelist, short story writer, playwright and a member of the royal family of Manipur
Yumlembam Gambhini Devi, recipient of the 1988 Sangeet Natak Akademi Award and the Padma Shri in 2005 for her contributions to Manipuri dance and music

Ratan Thiyam, theatre director and chairman of the Imphal Chorus Theatre, former chairman at National School of Drama
Neelamani Devi, craftswoman and master potter who was awarded the Padma Shri in 2007 for her contributions to the art of pottery making
Mary Kom, boxer and national representative at world sports events
Saikhom Mirabai Chanu, Indian weightlifter who won the silver medal at the 2020 Tokyo Olympics
Dingko Singh, boxer who won a gold medal at the 1998 Asian Games and was awarded the Padma Shri in 2013
Ngairangbam Bijoy Singh, doctor and politician
Uttam Leishangthem Singh, footballer
Binalakshmi Nepram, humanitarian, author, and female activist for gender rights and women-led disarmament movements in Manipur and northeast India
Irom Chanu Sharmila, also known as the "Iron Lady" or "Mengoubi" ("the fair one"), a civil rights activist, political activist, and poet
Robert Naorem, designer representative of indigenous designs of Manipur and involved in the Hindi film industry
Dheeraj Singh Moirangthem, footballer (India U-23, FC Goa)
Bombayla Devi Laishram, archer who was awarded the Arjuna Award in 2012 and the Padma Shri in 2019 by the Government of India for her contributions to sports
Sushila Chanu, Indian hockey player and former captain of Indian national women's hockey team
Loitongbam Ashalata Devi, Indian footballer who is the current captain of India women's national football team
Armstrong Pame, Indian Administrative Service officer
Nilakanta Sharma, played as a mid fielder in India men's national field hockey team in Tokyo Olympics 2020 which won bronze medal.

See also
 Moirang,Lamka.

References

External links 

 Imphal West (archived 27 September 2011)
 Imphal East

 
Cities and towns in Imphal East district
Cities and towns in Imphal West district
Tourism in Northeast India
1957 establishments in Manipur